Nofel Loshato may refer to:
 Neauphle-le-Château, a commune of France where Khomeini spent his exile
 Nofel Loshato District, an administrative subdivision of Iran named in honor of the previous